Boardmasters Festival is an annual music festival that takes place in Newquay, Cornwall in England. The following is a list of acts that have played at the festival.

2016

Main Stage

Unleashed

Land of Saints

The Point

2015

Main Stage

Unleashed

Mavericks

The Point

2014

Main Stage

Unleashed

Mavericks

The Point

Sunday Beach Sessions - Skindred, Jettblack, Boy Jumps Ship, Fink, Sunset Sons, Thomas J Speight

2013
Friday
Main Stage – The Vaccines, Everything Everything, Frightened Rabbit, The Other Tribe, Nina Nesbitt, Drenge, Ryan Keen, The Struts, Velcro Hooks, Hazards
Unleashed – Benga, Redlight, Mistajam, Friction, Ayar Marar, Majestic, Second City, Jello, Darko
Mavericks – We Are the Ocean, Dinosaur Pile Up, Tall Ships, The Physics House Band, Royal Blood, PJP Band, Dark Horses, I Am Giant, Gnarwolves, Bloody Knees, Honey, Week Night Thieves
The Point – Dusky, Bondax, Monki, Eton Messy, Discoguns, Adam Wyatt & Jim Rider, Alex Locke & Sean Moyle
Saturday
Main Stage – Basement Jaxx, Miles Kane, Delphic, Little Comets, Clean Bandit, Man Like Me, Ben Caplan, The Dexters, The Dedicated Nothing, Land of the Giants, 
Unleashed Stage – Simian Mobile Disco, Xxxy, Fenech Soler, Jakwob, Tom Staar, Jac The Disco, Ry Spencely, Jose Hugo, Ashley Thomas
Mavericks – Mallory Knox, Hawk Eyes, Brother & Bones, Crowns, Steve Smyth, The Sea, Dolomite Minor, Young Aviators, Rat Attack, Bad Channels
The Point – T.Williams, Gorgon City, Maribou State, Panda, Robin Paris, Ant Durkin, Luke Gledhill
Sunday
Main Stage – Ben Howard, The Joy Formidable, Tom Odell, Swim Deep, Hudson Taylor, Ahab, Story Books, Amber States, These Reigning Days
Unleashed – Grandmaster Flash, B.Traits ft MC Juma, CJ Beatz, Skints, Snatch The Wax, Breaks Collective, Kind Louie, Will Bailey
Mavericks – Temples, Little Barrie, The Virginmarys, The Computers, Wet Nuns, A Plastic Rose, Dancers, Great Cynics, Moriarty
The Point – MJ Cole, Copy Paste Soul, DEVolution, Justin Harris, Tim Nice, Piers Kirwan, Delux DJs

2012
Friday
Main Stage – Ed Sheeran, The Ting Tings, Donavno Frankenreiter, The Big Pink, The Jezabels, Sissy & The Blisters, Jake Bugg, Towns, Gabrielle Aplin, Gecko
Unleashed – DJ Fresh, Sway, Clement Marfo & The Frontline, Major Look, Snatch The Wax, Tim Nice, Deluxx DJs & Sax, Dante Gabriel, Robin Paris
Vans Stage – Pulled Part by Horses, While She Sleeps, Feed the Rhino, Hawk Eyes, Marmozets, Smoking Hearts, Great Cynics, Verses, As We Sink
Saturday
Main Stage – Dizzee Rascal, Maxïmo Park, Maverick Sabre, Delilah, Juan Zelada, Josh Kumra, Jenny O., Cut Ribbons, Lost Dawn
Unleashed – Zane Lowe, Doorly, NZ Shapeshifter, Krafty Kuts, The Beat Medics & Benny MC, Jac the Disco, Dancefloor Outlaws, Luke Gledhill, Ashley Thomas
Vans Stage – Set Your Goals, Futures, Turbowolf, Sharks, Eye Emma Jedi, Crowns, Exit Ten, Mixtapes, Eager Teeth, Hold the Sun, Kernuyck, Empire of Fools
Beach Sessions - Reel Big Fish, Xavier Rudd, The Black Seeds, The Skints, Aruba Red, Yes Sir Boss

2011
Friday
Main Stage – Klaxons, Bombay Bicycle Club, Eliz Doolittle, Benjamin Francis Leftwich, Friends Electric, Cloud Control, Yaaks, Flashguns, Pippa Marias, Brother and Bones
Relentless Stage – DJ Yoda, Gentlemans Dub Club, The Skints, Urban Knights, Back Beat Soundsystem, DJ Natty, Solo Collective DJs
Vans Stage – KIGH DJ Set, Skindred, Twin Atlantic, Francesqa, Crazy Arm, Straight Lines, Bangers, Veils, Suitnoir
Saturday
Main Stage – Fat Boy Slim, Sub Focus, Zane Lowe, Stereo MC's, Easy Star Allstars, Ben Howard, Willy Mason, Maverick Sabre, Dub the Earth, Lori Campbell, Crowns
Relentless Stage – Qemists, Lethal Bizzle, Art Brut, Wolf Gang, More Diamonds, The Violet May, I Am Harlequin, Spree, Solo Collective, DJ Natty

2010
Friday
Main Stage – Newton Faulkner, Seastick Steve, Xaver Rudd, Plan B, Tinie Tempah, Alan Pownall, Lisa Mitchell, Goldhawks, Peggy Sue, Thomas Ford
Relentless Stage – Charlie G, Gallows, Rolo Tomassi, Dwarves, TGOAT, Devil Sold His Soul, The Chapman Family, Japanese Voyeurs, Turbowolf, Sometime Never, The James Cleaver Quintet
Vans Stage – Kristoff, We Are The Ocean, Trash Talk, The Computers, Chickenhawk, Casino Brawl, Sharks, Lower Than Atlantis, Goodtime Boys, Cerebral Ballzy, March of the Raptors, Crocus, Rash Decision
Saturday
Main Stage – Leftfield, Chase & Status, Example, French Horn Rebellion, Ou Est Le Swimming Pool, Fenech Soler, Boy Who Trapped The Sun, Matthew P, Fishermans Friends, Three Minute Warning
Relentless Stage – Klimax & Benny MC, Chase & Status (DJ Set), New Young Pony Club, Crystal Fighters, Crazy P, Punks Jump Up, Urban Knights, The Cheek, Sound of Guns, Morning Parade, Teenagersintokyo, The Wild
Vans Stage – Jon Kennedy, Madina Lake, Young Guns, Failsafe, Little Fish, Paris Riots, Cars on Fire, White Belt Yellow Tag, Jettblack, Everything Burns, The Sum Of, WFFTS, Ape
Beach Sessions - The Futureheads, Zero 7 (DJ Set), Natty, Ben Howard, Reverend SS

2009
Friday
Main Stage – The Streets, Calvin Harris, Roots Manuva, The King Blues, Ash Grunwald, Master Shortie, Gold Teeth, Cosmo Jarvis, Rob Sawyer
Boardmasters Relentless Stage – Kissy Sell Out, Freeland, Pete & The Pirates, Fionn Regan, Sky Larkin, Wallis Bird, The Sea, Party Horse, The Answering Machine, The Boy Who Trapped in the Sun, 
Vans Stage – Brakes, Xcerts, Dinosaur Pile Up, Failsafe, This city, Jettblack, Telegraphs, Crazy Arm, Gentlemen's Pistols, Suit Noir, San Pablo, 
Saturday
Main Stage - Cypress Hill, Supper Furry Animals, Dan le Sac, Dreadzone, Will and the People, Ben Howard, Tristan Prettyman, Max Tuohy, Back Beat Soundsystem
Boardmasters Relentless Stage – Pendulum (DJ Set), Filthy Dukes, Tommy Sparkes, James Yuill, Fanfarlo, Chew Lips, Haunts, Rosie & The Goldbug, Pete Lawrie
Vans Stage – Ghost of a Thousand, Pulled Apart By Horses, The Plight, Outcry Collective, Hexes, The Computers, Sharks, Turbowolf, White Man Kamikaze, Don Broco, Everything Burns
Beach Sessions - The Blackout, We Are The Ocean, Pete Murray, Ben Howard, Sneaky Sound System, Jelly Jazz

2008
Friday
Main Stage - Groove Armada, The Zutons, Audio Bullys, Morcheeba, Natty, The Black Seeds, Yoav, Beau Young, Jersey Budd
Second Stage - Mystery Jets, The Holloways, Haunts, Sam Issaac, Jeremy Walmsley, Jersey Budd, Bookhouse Boys, The Locarnos, Rosie & The Goldbug
Saturday
Main Stage - The Pigeon Detectives, The Futureheads, Reverend & The Makers, Glas Vegas, The Young Knives, The Rifles, The Displacements, Red Light Company, Sam Isaac, Astro Firs
Second Stage - Gallows, Ghost of a Thousand, Johnny Truant, In Case of Fire, Slaves to Gravity, Hexes, Fighting With Wire, Skirtbox, Lioness

Festivals in Cornwall